Programme Two was one of the channels of Soviet Central Television between 1956 and 1991. It is now known as Russia-1.

Background
Programme Two began services in 1956 for Moscow and surrounding regions. It became a nationwide network in 1982, while Moscow-centric programmes were moved to Programme Three. It broadcast centralized entertainment produced in Moscow and the various Soviet republics via the republican television stations.

See also
Soviet Central Television
Eastern Bloc information dissemination

Eastern Bloc mass media
Mass media in Moscow
Soviet culture
Television in the Soviet Union
Defunct television channels in Russia
Television channels and stations established in 1956
Television channels and stations disestablished in 1991